Keith Ammon is an American politician. He is a member of the New Hampshire House of Representatives, representing the Hillsborough 40th District from 2014 to 2018 and re-elected in 2020.

Political career
Ammon served on the New Boston School Board from 2012 to 2015.

In 2014, he won the District 40 seat in the State House over Democrat Henry Mullaney. Ammon was re-elected in 2016 against Democrat Kat McGhee. In 2018, he lost the seat to Kat McGhee. In 2020, Ammon beat Democrat Ben Ming to again serve District 40.

In the New Hampshire House of Representatives Ammon serves as the clerk for the Commerce and Consumer Affairs committee. He is currently the Assistant Majority Whip.

Political positions

Abortion
In 2022, Ammon voted against HB 1609 which added an exception for a fatal fetal diagnosis to New Hampshire's 24 week ban on abortion services.

Education
In 2021, the Washington Post reported that Ammon was spearheading an effort to ban critical race theory in New Hampshire. Ammon's bill, as explained by The Atlantic, forbids schools from teaching “race or sex scapegoating,” questioning the value of meritocracy and suggesting that New Hampshire or the USA is “fundamentally racist.” House Bill 544 was signed into law by Governor Chris Sununu in July 2021.

Free State Project
Ammon moved to New Hampshire from Pennsylvania in 2009 as part of the Free State Project.

Cryptocurrency
In January 2016, he cosponsored a bill that would have allowed the state government to accept payment of taxes and fees in bitcoin. It was defeated in committee.

Privacy
In March 2016, he introduced a bill allowing public libraries to run privacy software. The bill was written with input from the Library Freedom Project.

Other information
Keith Ammon runs Ammon Technology Services, a software company specializing in pharmaceutical sales.

Ammon is a member of the NH House Freedom Caucus. He also serves as director of the New Boston Republican Committee and the New Boston Taxpayers' Association.

He contributed to the Bretton Woods Summit of Consumer's Research in 2017 and 2018 as a local subject matter expert on regulation in cryptocurrency. In 2018, he participated in a panel at the Harvard Club of Boston on the topic. The presentation was open to members only, but it is unclear if he himself is a member of the club, or whether he is an alumnus of Harvard or one of the other three institutions affiliated with the Club.

Ammon was named to GOPAC's Class of Emerging Leaders in 2016.

References

External links
 

Living people
Republican Party members of the New Hampshire House of Representatives
21st-century American politicians
Year of birth missing (living people)